Barsebäck is a boiling water nuclear power plant currently undergoing the process of nuclear decommissioning. The plant is situated in Barsebäck, Kävlinge Municipality, Skåne, Sweden.

Located 20 kilometers from the Danish capital, Copenhagen, the Danish government pressed for its closure during the entirety of its operating lifetime. As a result of a now former Swedish nuclear power phase-out, its two reactors have been closed down. The first reactor, Barsebäck 1, was closed November 30, 1999, and the second, Barsebäck 2, ceased operations May 31, 2005. At the time of closure, each reactor had a net capacity of 600 megawatts. Unit 1 supplied 93,8 TWh and unit 2 supplied 108,5 TWh to the electrical grid.

Land for the plant was bought in 1965 by the energy company Sydkraft, and the first of the two BWR reactors was ordered from Asea-Atom in 1969. Unit one first attained criticality on January 18, 1975 and commercial operation began on May 15. The second reactor attained criticality on March 21, 1977 and commercial operation began on July 1. Following a decision in the Riksdag in 1997, the Government of Sweden decided that the first reactor was to close July 1, 1998, and the second July 1, 2001. Due to the operator's appeal of the decision and lack of emission-free replacement, the closure was postponed.

The demolition of the facility will await the construction of a storage facility, scheduled to be ready in the 2020s. In December 2018 a strategy was outlined for the "radiological demolition" to be carried out between 2020 and 2028. This will allow the land to be used for other nuclear power related purposes.

The plant is operated by Barsebäck Kraft AB, a subsidiary of Sydkraft Nuclear Power AB, owned by Uniper.

References

External links

 Home page

Nuclear power stations in Sweden
Nuclear power stations using boiling water reactors
Vattenfall nuclear power stations
Former nuclear power stations
Former power stations in Sweden